Malekabad (also Romanized as Malekābād; also known as Malek Shāh) is a village in Yam Rural District, Meshkan District, Khoshab County, Razavi Khorasan Province, Iran. At the 2006 census, its population was 88, in 30 families.

References 

Populated places in Khoshab County